Symydobius is a genus of true bugs belonging to the family Aphididae.

The species of this genus are found in Europe and Northern America.

Species:
 Symydobius alniarius (Matsumura, 1917) 
 Symydobius americanus Baker, 1918

References

Aphididae